The men's 110 metres hurdles event at the 2011 Military World Games was held on 20 and 21 July at the Estádio Olímpico João Havelange.

Records
Prior to this competition, the existing world and CISM record were as follows:

Schedule

Medalists

Results

Semifinals

Final
Wind: 0.0 m/s

References

110 metres hurdles